The Battle of Kock was fought in 1809 during the Napoleonic Wars, near the town of Kock in Poland.

The battle saw the death of Polish Army colonel Berek Joselewicz, fighting against the Austrian Empire for the freedom of Poland.

Course
The Polish cavalry had been tasked with clearing Austrian troops out of the way of the main force and capturing crossings over the river Wieprz. 

The only Austrian forces in the area withdrew to Kock on 2 May - this was formed of two squadrons (totalling around 300 men) of the 1st Hussars, commanded by major Friedrich Hoditz. The force was tasked with destroying all the crossings over the Wieprz. On 7 May Joselewicz attacked the Austrians at the head of his squadron. After a brief struggle, the hussars retreated in disarray and the bridge was captured intact. Joselewicz was killed - pursuing the fleeing hussars too closely, he was wounded, surrounded and killed despite pleading to surrender. His precise gravesite is unknown, though a cenotaph to him stands on the road between Kock and Bialobrzegi.

Polish casualties were 1 dead and 7 injured, whilst the Austrians lost 11 killed, 8 wounded and 8 captured, including one captain. After the battle Hoditz withdrew towards Lublin. Almost immediately after the battle, colonel Turno (commander of the 5th Mounted Rifles Regiment) wrote a letter to Hoditz criticising his soldiers' behaviour.

Bibliography
Mała Encyklopedia Wojskowa, 1967, Wydanie I.
Łuniński Ernest, Berek Joselewicz i jego syn: zarys historyczny Warszawa 1909
Bronisław Pawłowski, Wojna polsko-austriacka 1809 r. Warszawa 1999
Roman Sołtyk, Kampania 1809 r.: raport o działaniach armii pozostającej pod rozkazami ks. J. Poniatowskiego podczas kampanii 1809 r. Warszawa 1906

Kock 1809
Kock
1809 in the Austrian Empire